Juan de Valdés Carasquilla was a Spanish engraver of the Baroque period, active in Seville. He was the son of the painter Juan de Valdés Leal, He specialized in engraving religious subjects for books of devotion.

References

Year of birth unknown
Year of death unknown
People from Seville
Spanish engravers
Spanish Baroque painters
Painters from Seville